Union is a NJ Transit railroad station in Union, New Jersey. Located on the Conrail Lehigh Line, Union is served by Raritan Valley Line trains that travel between Newark Penn Station and Raritan. There is also limited service to and from High Bridge and New York Penn Station and one morning train to Hoboken Terminal. The physical structures of the station are owned by NJ Transit; however, the land remains the property of Conrail Shared Assets Operations, which is in turn owned by Norfolk Southern Railway and CSX Corporation.

History
The station is located at milepost 14.6 on the Conrail Lehigh Line. This is part of the former Lehigh Valley Railroad main line, built by LV subsidiary Newark & Roselle Railway. The Township of Union had been served until the 1940s by Townley station, 0.5 miles to the east at milepost 14.1. With the station demolished by the Lehigh Valley Railroad in the 1940s, officials decided not to add a stop in 1967 during the Aldene Plan. The project was a joint program between the railroads, the New Jersey Department of Transportation, and the Port Authority of New York and New Jersey, which elevated trackage above ground level to eliminate grade crossings and rerouted Central Railroad of New Jersey trains to Pennsylvania Station in Newark, New Jersey.

When bankruptcy struck the Central Railroad of New Jersey and Lehigh Valley Railroad, the railroads were forced to fold into the Consolidated Rail Corporation on April 1, 1976. On that date, the New Jersey Department of Transportation took over commuter rail operations. In 1981 the state government created NJ Transit to oversee all commuter operations, rail and bus, in the state. Since then, NJ Transit has continued to operate and expand services on the Raritan Valley Line.

Completed in 2003 at a cost of $24.8 million, the station filled the eight mile stretch Newark Penn Station and Roselle Park station. It is adjacent to Kean University. Station amenities include a waiting room, rest rooms, vendors, and a 464-space parking lot. The station features artwork reproducing the 40th parallel of the Earth's northern hemisphere, and shows cities through which the 40th parallel runs including Lisbon, Rome, and Beijing. Currently, the station is served by 53 weekday and 36 weekend NJ Transit trains.

Dedication
On September 24, 2013, the station was dedicated to Congressman Bob Franks.

Station layout and service
The station has one high-level island platform. Due to the high level of freight service on Track 2, some inbound trains utilize Track 1.

Freight operations
The station has a gauntlet track (a slightly shifted-over track) on the track 2 side that allows freight trains to pass the high level platform safely. The route has become a critical artery in transcontinental transportation, particularly for intermodal, retail and petrochemical traffic. Tonnage over this route reaches as far west as Chicago and Los Angeles, south to Atlanta and Jacksonville, and east to Vermont and Maine. Currently 30-40 freights operate past the station depending on the day of the week.

References 

NJ Transit Rail Operations stations
Railway stations in the United States opened in 2003
Railway stations in Union County, New Jersey
Stations on the Raritan Valley Line
Former Lehigh Valley Railroad stations
Union Township, Union County, New Jersey
Railway stations in New Jersey at university and college campuses
Kean University
2003 establishments in New Jersey